G major (or the key of G) is a major scale based on G, with the pitches G, A, B, C, D, E, and F. Its key signature has one sharp.  Its relative minor is E minor and its parallel minor is G minor.

The G major scale is:

Notable compositions

Baroque period 
In Baroque music, G major was regarded as the "key of benediction".

Of Domenico Scarlatti's 555 keyboard sonatas, G major is the home key for 69, or about 12.4%, sonatas.

In the music of Johann Sebastian Bach, "G major is often a key of  chain rhythms", according to Alfred Einstein, although Bach also used the key for some -based works, including his third and fourth Brandenburg Concertos. Pianist Jeremy Denk observes that the Goldberg Variations are 80 minutes in G major.

Classical era
Twelve of Joseph Haydn's 106 symphonies are in G major. Likewise, one of Haydn's most famous piano trios, No. 39 (with the Gypsy Rondo), and one of his last two complete published string quartets (Op. 77, No. 1), are in G major.

In addition, G major is the home key of Mozart's Eine kleine Nachtmusik, serving as the tonic for three of its four movements (the only exception being the second movement, titled Romanze which is in the subdominant key of C major). However, almost none of his large-scale works such as his symphonies or concertos are in this key; exceptions are the Violin concerto no. 3, Piano Concerto No. 17, Flute Concerto No. 1 and his String Quartet No. 14, along with some examples among his juvenilia.

For Ludwig van Beethoven, G major was a key for optimism and cheerful energy. He regularly used this key, for instance in 
 Piano Sonata No. 10, Op. 14/2
Piano Sonata No. 16, Op. 31/1
Piano Sonata No. 20, Op. 49/2
Piano Sonata No. 25, Op. 79
Rondo for piano, Op. 51/2
Rondo à Capriccio "Rage over a lost Penny" (in German "Die Wut über den verlorenen Groschen") for piano, Op. 129
Violin Sonata No. 8, Op. 30/3
Violin Sonata No. 10, Op. 96
String Trio No. 2, Op. 9/1
String Quartet No. 2, Op. 18/2
Piano Trio No. 2, Op. 1/2
 Romance for violin and orchestra, Op. 40
 Piano Concerto No. 4, Op. 58.

Franz Schubert rarely used the key of G major, although a few important compositions are written in this key, including Mass No. 2 D 167, String Quartet No. 15 D 887 and Piano Sonata op. 78 D 894.

Romantic era
The Romantic composers more often used minor keys, as well as major keys with more sharps and flats. Composers like Robert Schumann, Felix Mendelssohn, César Franck, Max Bruch, Anton Bruckner, Modest Mussorgsky, Alexander Borodin, César Cui and Sergei Rachmaninoff only used this key in a few small-scale or miscellaneous compositions, or even avoided it at all.
Nonetheless, some important Romantic music was written in G major.

Frédéric Chopin's Prelude Op. 28/3, his Nocturne Op. 37/2 and his Mazurka Op. 50/1 are in G major.

It is also the key of three major chamber music compositions by Johannes Brahms: String Sextet No. 2 Op. 36, Violin Sonata No. 1 Op. 78 and String Quintet No. 2 Op. 111.
Antonín Dvorák wrote four important pieces in G major: String Quintet No. 2, Op. 77, Symphony No. 8 Op. 88, Sonatina for Violin and Piano Op. 100, which he wrote for his children, and String Quartet No. 13, Op. 106.

The Violin Sonata No. 2 Op. 13 by Edvard Grieg is in G major.

Camille Saint-Saëns chose G major as the key for his String Quartet No. 2 and his Sonata for Bassoon and Piano. Gabriel Fauré only wrote one major composition in this key: his second Barcarolle for Piano, Op. 41.

The three major compositions in G major of Pyotr Ilyich Tchaikovsky are his Piano Concerto No. 2 Op. 44 and his orchestral suites No. 3, Op. 55 and No. 4 "Mozartiana" Op. 61.
Three Préludes for Piano (Op. 11/3, Op. 13/3 and Op. 39/3) by Alexander Scriabin are in G major, as well as the Mazurka for orchestra op. 18, the String Quartet No. 3 Op. 26 and the Oriental Rhapsody for orchestra Op. 29 by Alexander Glazunov.

Gustav Mahler's Symphony No. 4 and Richard Strauss's tone poem Aus Italien Op. 16, are also in G major.

In popular culture
G major is the key stipulated by Queen Elizabeth II to be used for "God Save the Queen" in Canada. The anthem "God Defend New Zealand" ("Aotearoa") was originally composed by John Joseph Woods in A-flat major, but after becoming New Zealand's national anthem in 1977, it was rearranged into G major to better suit general and massed singing. According to Spotify, G major is the most common key of music on the streaming service (closely followed by C major).

See also
Major and minor
Chord (music)
Chord notation

References

External links

Musical keys
Major scales